

Orr Dunkelman is an Israeli cryptographer and cryptanalyst, currently a professor at the University of Haifa Computer Science department. Dunkelman is a co-director of the Center for Cyber Law & Privacy at the University of Haifa and a co-founder of Privacy Israel, an Israeli NGO for promoting privacy in Israel.

Biography 
Dunkelman received all his degrees at the Technion - Israel Institute of Technology. He received his Ph.D. degree at the age of 25, under the supervision of Eli Biham. Before joining the University of Haifa, Dunkelman held post-doctoral positions at KU Leuven, at École normale supérieure, and at the Weizmann Institute of Science.

Contributions to cryptanalysis 
Among his contributions to cryptanalysis are:
 Dissection attack – joint work with Itai Dinur, Nathan Keller, and Adi Shamir, recipient of the Best Paper Award at the Crypto 2012 conference.
 Rectangle attack – joint work with Eli Biham and Nathan Keller.
 New variants of differential-linear, boomerang, and slide attacks – joint works with Eli Biham, Adi Shamir, and other co-authors.
 Breaking (together with Eli Biham, Sebastiaan Indesteege, Nathan Keller, and Bart Preneel)   KeeLoq – a block cipher used in remote keyless entry systems by multiple companies.
 Devising (jointly with Eli Biham) a practical attack on A5/1 – the cipher used in GSM security mechanisms.
 Attacking reduced-round variants of many block ciphers, including AES, Serpent, IDEA, GOST, DES, KASUMI, MISTY1, Camellia, Skipjack and others (in joint works with various coauthors).

New cryptographic primitives 
Dunkelman has taken part in the design of several new cryptographic primitives:
 HAIFA construction (with Eli Biham) – a cryptographic structure used in the design of hash functions.
 KATAN and KTANTAN (with Cristophe De Canniere and Miroslav Knežević) - a family of small and efficient hardware-oriented block ciphers.
 SHAvite-3 (with Eli Biham), a hash function which was one of the 14 semifinalists in the NIST hash function competition.

Awards and honors 
Dunkelman received the Krill Prize from the Wolf Foundation in 2014, and papers he co-authored won the Best Paper Award at the Crypto conference (2012) and at the Fast Software Encryption (FSE) conference (2012).

References

External links 
 
 
 Webpage of the Center for Cyber Law & Privacy at the University of Haifa
 
 

1980 births
Israeli computer scientists
Dunkelman Orr
Israeli Jews
Living people
Modern cryptographers
Dunkelman Orr